"Optimistic" is a song by American vocal and instrumental ensemble Sounds of Blackness, recorded for their debut studio album The Evolution of Gospel  (1991). It was written and produced by Gary Hines, Jimmy Jam and Terry Lewis, and features vocals from Ann Bennett-Nesby, Carrie Harrington, Coré Cotton, Patricia Lacy, and Jamecia Bennett. The urban contemporary gospel song was released as the group's debut single and reached the top three on Billboards Hot R&B Singles chart. A remake by August Greene featuring Brandy was released in 2018. Jadakiss also recorded a version of the song, titling it "Keep Ya Head Up". The song was included on his first album, Kiss Tha Game Goodbye.

Charts

References

1991 songs
1991 singles
2018 singles
Songs written by Jimmy Jam and Terry Lewis
Gospel songs
Brandy Norwood songs